Dile al sol is the debut album from Spanish pop rock band La Oreja de Van Gogh released by Sony Music Entertainment in May 1998.  The album was very successful in Spain, selling more than 800,000 copies there.

This first album was recorded in Madrid between the months of July and August 1997. The title track from this album, Dile al sol (Tell the Sun), was the one with which people began to know them, but it was not until Cuéntame al oído (Tell me in the ear) that the band became a success.

Track listing

Outtakes – Aquella ingrata (That ungrateful girl), Déjate llevar (Get carried away)

Personnel

Performing
 La Oreja de Van Gogh
 Amaia Montero – vocals, backing vocals
 Pablo Benegas – guitar
 Xabi San Martín – keyboards, programming
 Álvaro Fuentes – bass
 Haritz Garde – percussion
 Mikel Erentxun  – backing vocals
 Txetxo Bengoetxea  – backing vocals
 Pablo Martín – backing vocals
 Josu García – backing vocals, guitar
 Marcelo Fuentes – bass
 Fernando Samalea – percussion
 Francis Amat – piano

Technical
 Alejo Stivel – record production
 Barry Sage – sound recording, audio mixing, audio mastering
 Josu García – record production
 Marta García – sound recording
 Alberto Vidal – sound recording
 Gugu Martínez – audio engineering

Design
 Carlos Martín – graphic design
 Jesús Ugalde – photography
 Luis Oliveira – hair & makeup
 Oddyty San Sebastián, Guipúzcoa, Spain – wardrobe

Sales and certifications

See also
List of best-selling albums in Spain

References

1999 debut albums
La Oreja de Van Gogh albums